Unicorn is the debut album by British dance-pop trio Chew Lips. It was released on 25 January 2010.

Track listing
"Eight" – 3:08
"Play Together" – 2:37
"Slick" – 4:36
"Karen" – 3:31
"Too Much Talking" – 3:52
"Toro" – 2:48
"Two Years" – 2:43
"Seven" – 3:17
"Two Hands" – 2:38
"Gold Key" – 3:27
"Piano Song" – 2:13

References

2010 debut albums